District 20 of the Texas Senate is a senatorial district that currently serves all of Brooks, Jim Wells counties and portions of Hidalgo and Nueces counties in the U.S. state of Texas.

The current Senator from District 20 is Juan "Chuy" Hinojosa.

Top 5 biggest cities in district
District 20 has a population of 833,339 with 577,960 that is at voting age from the 2010 census.

Election history
Election history of District 20 from 1992.

Previous elections

2020

2016

2012

2008

2004

2002

1998

1994

1992

District officeholders

Notes

References

20
Brooks County, Texas
Hidalgo County, Texas
Jim Wells County, Texas
Nueces County, Texas